Museum für Kommunikation ("Communications Museum") is the name of several museums in German-speaking countries, including:

In Germany

 Museum für Kommunikation Frankfurt
 Museum für Kommunikation Hamburg
 Museum für Kommunikation Nürnberg
Philatelic Archive in Bonn

In Switzerland
 Museum für Kommunikation Bern